The discography of South Korean girl group Jewelry consists of eight studio albums, one extended play, twenty-six singles, and two soundtrack appearances. Formed in 2001, the group debuted with the single "I Love You", and had gone through numerous line-up changes before disbanding in January 2015.

Albums

Studio albums

Extended plays

Singles

Soundtrack appearances

Music videos

Notes

References 

Discographies of South Korean artists
K-pop music group discographies